Sylvia Limmer is a German politician who is serving as an Alternative for Germany Member of the European Parliament.

Limmer trained as a veterinary nurse before completing a PhD in biology at the University of Bayreuth. She has been a member of the AfD since 2016 and is deputy chairwoman of the AfD district association in Bayreuth. In 2019, she was elected to the European Parliament as an MEP for the party. In the European Parliament, she sits on the Committee on the Environment, Public Health and Food Safety (ENVI), the delegation for relations with Israel and the delegation for relations with the People's Republic of China.

References

External links

Living people
MEPs for Germany 2019–2024
Alternative for Germany MEPs
21st-century women MEPs for Germany
1966 births